He Shall Thunder in the Sky (2000) (also published as Thunder in the Sky) is the 12th in a series of historical mystery novels by Elizabeth Peters, featuring fictional archaeologist and sleuth Amelia Peabody.

Plot
The novel takes place in 1914, as Ramses Emerson works undercover to gather intelligence for the British military, Nefret returns from studying medicine in Switzerland, and Percy Peabody returns to wreak revenge on the Emerson family for past events. The Emerson have acquired the firman for part of the Giza concession, but of course are distracted by the criminal element, and eventually by a startling revelation from the Master Criminal, Sethos himself.

Explanation of the novel's title
The title comes from a translation of "The Contendings of Horus and Set" from a papyrus in the Chester Beatty Library:
"Then Re-Harakte said: Let Set be given unto me, to dwell with me and be my son. He shall thunder in the sky and be feared."

References to historical events or persons
The novel's climax coincides with the First Suez Offensive, the attack launched by the Ottoman Empire on the Suez Canal in January 1915.

Awards
The novel was nominated for an Agatha Award in the "Best Novel" category in 2000 and for the 2001 Anthony Award in the same category.

See also

List of characters in the Amelia Peabody series

References

Amelia Peabody
2000 novels
Historical mystery novels
Fiction set in 1914
Novels set in the 1910s